Dick Richard Sedar (March 27, 1931 - June 6, 2019) was an American politician in the state of Wyoming. He served in the Wyoming House of Representatives as a member of the Democratic Party. He attended the University of Wyoming and was a businessman.

References

1931 births
2019 deaths
Politicians from Casper, Wyoming
Democratic Party Wyoming state senators
University of Wyoming alumni
Democratic Party members of the Wyoming House of Representatives
Wyoming lawyers
20th-century American lawyers